Philipp Jordan (born 1974 in Bonn) is a German artist and grew up in Karlsruhe. Before he created his 1000 teddies project, which he is now mostly known for, he was a Graffiti artist in the early 1990s.

Life 
From 1998 to 2000 he studied at the Freie Kunstschule in Stuttgart Graphic Design. Then he moved to Freiburg, where he continued his studies in graphic design at the free university for graphic design and visual arts. In 2003 he moved to The Netherlands and studied illustration at the Hogeschool voor de art, an art academy in Utrecht.

1989 to 1995 he was an active part of the Graffiti scene.

Philip Jordan is married. He lives and works in Utrecht.

Works 
Philipp Jordan's origins were graffiti and comics. He finds the main source of inspiration is childhood as a fictional place. For his work he frequently uses Oilbar and spray paint. Currently, the project 1000 Teddies with exhibitions in Vienna, Düsseldorf, Hamburg, Los Angeles, San Diego and Utrecht (Netherlands), is the most famous project of Philipp Jordan. Philipp Jordan returns from time to time to his comic book roots and designs booklets as a comic.

Projects 
Teddies!, Bienale Liverpool 2010
1000 Teddies, installation
Knock On Wood, wood painting series
Beauty of the Beast, exhibition series

References

External links 
 , 1000 Teddies website
 , Liverpool Biennial installation
 , 1000 Teddies at KUSI San Diego
 , Teddies Mural in Liverpool, UK

German contemporary artists
German male artists
Living people
1974 births